This article contains a list of street gangs, organize crime syndicates, and criminal enterprises in Australia.

Multiracial
 Black Power - mixed ethnic makeup but predominantly Māori and Polynesian.
 Brothers 4 Life – composed of Arab and Middle Eastern Males.
Mongrel Mob - mixed but predominantly Māori and Polynesian.
Core Suicide - Turkish, Afghan, And Arabic Association
41kay - mixed but predominantly English, Māori and Polynesian.

Aboriginal-based
Loyal Crims|Gaol street Gang 
 KGB- Koondoola Girrawheen Balga
Naala Moort
Evil Warriors
North Street Boys
Sean Marcusson Crew
Jeff Cutts Crew
OBK- Our Brothers Keepers

Asian, Triads & Tongs
14K 
Assyrian Kings
Bamboo Union 
DLASTHR
Lebanese Mafia
Pakistan Mafia
Sam Gor
Sun Yee On
Sword Boys
 Various Snakehead gangs
Wo Shing Wo

Caucasian/European-Australian
Loyal Crims|Gaol street gang 
Albanian Mafia
Antipodean Resistance
Australian Defence League 
Barbaro 'ndrina
Brothers from Inside (BFI)
Bulgarian Mafia
The Carlton Crew 
Greek Mafia
Honoured Society 
Irish Mob
Moran family 
'Ndrangheta
Pettingill Family
Radev Bratva (defunct)
Romanian Mafia
Russian Mafia
Satudarah
Serbian Mafia
Siderno Group
Soldiers of Odin
Southern Cross Hammerskins
Outkasts (The OC)
13 Kings (Brisbane based)
Williams Syndicate

Hispanic/Latino
MS-13

Outlaw motorcycle clubs
Bandidos Motorcycle Club
Diablos Motorcycle Club 
Fat Mexican Support Club
Black Uhlans Motorcycle Club
Club Deroes Motorcycle Club
Coffin Cheaters Motorcycle Club
Comanchero Motorcycle Club
Derelicts Motorcycle Club
Descendants Motorcycle Club
Devils Henchmen Motorcycle Club
Finks Motorcycle Club
Foolish Few Motorcycle Club
Fourth Reich Motorcycle Club
Gladiators Motorcycle Club
Gypsy Joker Motorcycle Club
Hells Angels Motorcycle Club
Red Devils Motorcycle Club
Highway 61 Motorcycle Club
Immortals Motorcycle Club
Lone Wolf Motorcycle Club
Loners Motorcycle Club
Mobshitters Motorcycle Club
Mongols Motorcycle Club
Muslim Brotherhood Movement Motorcycle Club
No Surrender Motorcycle Club
Nomads Motorcycle Club
Notorious Motorcycle Club
Odin's Warriors Motorcycle Club
Outcasts Motorcycle Club
Outlaws Motorcycle Club
Rebels Motorcycle Club
Rock Machine
Renegades Motorcycle Club
Sadistic Souls Motorcycle Club
Satan's Riders Motorcycle Club
Throttle Stomper Motorcycle Club

Unknown ethnic makeup
Bronx Boys
True Kings
Various Bloods sets 
Various Crips sets

References 

Crime in Australia
Gangs in Australia
Lists of gangs